Huron Heights is a neighbourhood in the City of London, Ontario, Canada. Located in the northeast part of the city, development began around 1960 and continued to the late 1960s in four distinct phases (one of which was commonly known as Huron Village), and included three public elementary schools, and provided students to one Catholic elementary in the area and one public secondary school just northwest of the development. A large commercial plaza with anchor grocery and department stores was developed at the west edge, and a neighbourhood plaza was developed in the central part.  A city arena was built and later supplemented with a public swimming pool.

Huron Heights consists mostly of low-density, single detached dwellings. As of 2011, the area is home to 19,470 residents. Most of the neighbourhood is considered a lower-income area with an average family income of $71,288, an average dwelling value of $231,279 and a home ownership rate of 57%.

It also is home to thousands of students residents from Fanshawe College and the University of Western Ontario.

Government and politics
Huron Heights exists within the federal electoral district of London-Fanshawe.  It is currently represented by Lindsay Mathyssen of the New Democratic Party, first elected in 2019.

Provincially, the area is within the constituency of London-Fanshawe.  It is currently represented by Teresa Armstrong of the New Democratic, first elected in 2011 and re-elected in 2014, 2018, and 2022.

In London's non-partisan municipal politics, Huron Heights lies within ward 3. It is currently represented by Councillor Peter Cuddy, first elected in 2022.

Institutions

Education

 Fanshawe College - public college of applied arts and technology, based in London.
 Montcalm Secondary School - public secondary school and part of the Thames Valley District School Board.
 John Paul II Catholic Secondary School - separate (Catholic) secondary school and part of the London District Catholic School Board.
 Chippewa Public School - public elementary school and part of the Thames Valley District School Board.
 Evelyn Harrison Public School - public elementary school and part of the Thames Valley District School Board.
 Lord Elgin Public School - public elementary school and part of the Thames Valley District School Board.

Location

The neighbourhood is bordered by Oxford Street to the south, Clarke Road to the east, the Thames River to the north, and Briarhill Avenue/Barker Street to the west. It is bordered by the residential neighbourhoods of Argyle, Carling, Stoneybrook, and Fanshawe, as well as the mainly industrial Airport neighbourhood.

References

Neighbourhoods in London, Ontario